Tooele High School is a secondary school located in Tooele, Utah, United States currently educating students in grades 9–12. Operated by the Tooele County School District, Tooele High enrolls approximately 1,800 students each year. The Tooele High mascot is the White Buffalo.

History
Tooele High opened for the 1913 school year. In 1955 a new high school was behind the old building, while the older building continued to be used by Tooele County School District until its demolition in 1974. The current school was built to the west of the second high school, and was opened for the remainder of the 2002–2003 school year. The school celebrated its centennial during the 2012–2013 school year.

The campus, in the 1990s, was across the street from the city swimming pool. Students used the swimming pool, which the district leased from the city, and students also used the park area during lunchtime.

In 1997, 170 more students joined the student body. That year, due to overcrowding, the school added one minute to passing time.

Academics
Tooele High offers multiple AP and Honors classes, and offers Concurrent Enrollment through Utah State University, Salt Lake Community College, and Utah Valley University including classes offered at different schools in the district (*).

AP Classes Offered

 AP English Literature
 AP English Language
 AP Calculus AB/BC
 AP Statistics
 AP Physics C Mechanics
 AP Biology
 AP Chemistry
 AP World History
 AP US Government and Politics
 AP United States History
 AP Psychology
 AP Studio Art
 AP Music Theory

Activities
Tooele High School offers students the following clubs and organizations:

 Art Club
 Band
 Bowling Club
 Buffalog
 Buff Radio
 Cheerleading
 Show Choir
 Chamber Strings
 Color Guard (Majestix)
 Dance Company
 Debate Club
 Drama Club
 Drill Team (Sha-ronns)
 FBLA
 FCCLA
 FFA
 French Club
 German Club
 GSA
 Herd Club
 HOSA
 Key Club
 Literary Magazine
 MESA
 National Honors Society
 Orchestra
 Psychology Club
 Skills USA
 Spanish Club
 Swim Team
 Student Government
 T.A.A.G.
 Team Buffalo
 Tooele Sign Pride
 Water Polo
 Yearbook
 Z-Motion

Athletics
Tooele High competes in the USHAA classification of 5A in Region 7. Tooele High focuses on football and basketball, but also has strong swimming and softball teams. The most recent state titles being 2002 3A state football, 2005 3A state boys basketball, 2019 4A state girls softball. Tooele High has a strong rivalry with Stansbury High School, and continues to have a basic rivalry with Grantsville High School.

State Championships

Baseball: 1996

Boys basketball: 2004-05

Girls basketball: 1976–77, 1991–92

Football: 1934, 1937, 2002

Boys golf: 1977–78, 1998–99

Boys soccer: 1997

Softball: 1991, 1992, 1998, 2003, 2004, 2005, 2007, 2008, 2010, 2019

Girls swimming: 1999, 2001(tie with Cedar)

Boys swimming: 1955, 1956, 1957, 1958, 1959, 1960, 1961, 1962, 1963, 1982, 1983, 1984, 1985, 2002

Wrestling: 1981

Notable alumni
Keever Jankovich, NFL player
Ron Rydalch, NFL player
Eugene E. Campbell Utah historian
Beverly White, longest serving woman in the Utah State Legislature

References

Schools in Tooele County, Utah
Public high schools in Utah